Arthur Albert Loach (8 November 1863 – 9 February 1958) was an English footballer who played as a forward. He joined West Bromwich Albion in August 1882 and became one of the club's first professionals three years later when the FA legalised payments to players. He was on the losing side as Albion lost 0–2 to Blackburn Rovers in the 1886 FA Cup Final. In May 1886 he moved to Aston Villa on a free transfer and remained there until joining Rhyl in August 1888. Loach retired from football in 1896 and went on to run a hotel in Rhyl.

References

1863 births
1958 deaths
Sportspeople from West Bromwich
English footballers
West Bromwich Albion F.C. players
Aston Villa F.C. players
Association football forwards
FA Cup Final players